WCOM may refer to:

 WCOM-FM, a radio station (89.3 FM) licensed to serve Silver Creek, New York, United States
 WCOM-LP, a radio station (103.5 FM) licensed to serve Chapel Hill, North Carolina, United States